Tutaekuri or Tūtaekurī may refer to the following:

Rivers in New Zealand
Tutaekuri River, Hastings District, Hawke's Bay, flowing from near Taihape to Clive
Tutaekuri River (Wairoa District), Hawke's Bay, flowing into the Waiau River
Tūtaekurī River (West Coast), flowing from the Hope Pass to the Ahaura River

Plants
 A potato cultivar
 Anthosachne kingiana, a type of grass, whose Māori name is Tūtae kurī